Iván Archivaldo Guzmán Salazar, alias "Chapito", is a Mexican drug lord . He is the son of imprisoned trafficker Joaquín "El Chapo" Guzmán, who led the Sinaloa Cartel until his extradition to the United States in 2017.

According to U.S. government sources and observers of the narcotics trade, Iván Archivaldo, his brother Jesús Alfredo Guzmán Salazar and half-brothers Ovidio Guzmán López and Joaquín Guzmán López have taken over facets of their father's business. They are commonly referred to as the "Chapitos."

Early life and family 
There is conflicting information about Ivan's date and place of birth. A June 2012 release by the Office of Foreign Assets Control of the United States Department of the Treasury (which placed both Chapito and his father on the Kingpin Act list) states his birthday as 2 October 1980. A 2019 report by Infobae claims his birthday is in October 1983. The United States Department of State on 16 December 2021 listed his date of birth as 15 August 1983 and place of birth as Zapopan, Jalisco state.

Ivan's mother is María Alejandrina Salazar Hernández, Guzmán's first wife. They married in 1977. According to Infobae, she is a relative of trafficker Héctor Luis Palma Salazar (alias "El Güero" or "Whiteboy"), an associate of Chapo dating to their time in the Guadalajara Cartel. The Guadalajara Cartel is the organization Palma, Guzmán and Zambada García splintered to form the Sinaloa Cartel.

Ivan's siblings in the Guzmán Salazar branch are Alejandrina Giselle Guzmán Salazar, Cesar Guzmán Salazar and Jesús Alfredo Guzmán Salazar (alias "Alfredillo").

According to InSight Crime, the Guzmán Salazar brothers Iván and Jesús along with their half-brother Ovidio Guzmán López were brought into the Sinaloa Cartel as teenagers by their father and his co-leader Ismael "El Mayo" Zambada García.

2005 arrest and imprisonment 
Multiple contemporary news reports state that that in April 2004, Ivan was involved in the murder of Canadian exchange student Kristen Deyell and her Mexican companion César Augusto Pulido Mendoza. The case did not reach a conclusion.

In February 2005, Zapopan Municipal Police Officers (ZMP) arrested Iván Archivaldo Guzmán Salazar, Jorge Ozuna-Tovar, and Alfredo Gomez-Diaz as they sat in their vehicle waiting for another carload of associates. Prior to the arrest of Guzman-Salazar, ZMP had observed a man being thrown from a vehicle. The ZMP pursued the vehicle and eventually detained five subjects later identified as associates of Guzman-Salazar.

In early June 2005, Chapo posted his $55,000 bail bond and Ivan was released; federal police quickly re-arrested him. The government imprisoned Iván Archivaldo in Federal Social Readaptation Center No. 1 "La Palma" while he awaited trial on the charge of money laundering. According to one report by journalist Anabel Hernandez, Ivan Archivaldo requested his father send warmer clothes to deal with the cold of the prison. When Chapo asked requested guards' help in smuggling contraband clothing, they raised their fees five-fold to $500,000. Later, Chapo would have the guards captured, tortured and murdered, then left their dismembered bodies on the outskirts of Mexico City International Airport.

In 2008, Iván Archivaldo Guzmán Salazar was found guilty of money laundering and sentenced to five years imprisonment. He successfully appealed the verdict, however, and he was released later that year.

United States indictment 
In 2012, the United States Department of the Treasury's Office of Foreign Assets Control designated Guzmán Salazar under the Foreign Narcotics Kingpin Designation Act, naming him a "lieutenant" of Chapo Guzman in the Sinaloa Cartel along with Ovidio Guzmán López.

In 2013, a grand jury in United States District Court for the Southern District of California indicted Sinaloa boss "El Mayo" Mario Zambada García, two of Zambada's sons Ismael Zambada-Sicairos (known as “Mayito Flaco”) and Ismael Zambada-Imperial (known as "Mayito Gordo") as well as Iván Archivaldo Guzmán Salazar. "El Mayo" Zambada is charged with violating the Continuing Criminal Enterprise Statute (also known as the "Kingpin Statute"); all of the defendants are charged with counts of conspiracy to distribute and import narcotics. The court unsealed indictment and issued warrant for Ivan Archivaldo Guzman Salazar's arrest on issued 25 July 2014.

Ismael Zambada-Imperial was arrested in Mexico in November 2014, then extradited in 2019. He pled guilty in 2021.

Kidnapping 
On 15 August 2016, members of the Cártel de Jalisco Nueva Generación (CJNG) kidnapped Iván Archivaldo Guzmán Salazar, his brother Jesús Alfredo Guzmán Salazar, and four other persons. The kidnapping occurred in broad daylight in the exclusive restaurant La Leche in the bustling tourist area of Puerto Vallarta.

The following week both the family of Chapo Guzman and the DEA confirmed that Alfredo, Ivan, and the others were released.

After the imprisonment of Chapo 
Following the 2019 conviction of Chapo Guzman in the United States v. Guzmán case, the United States Department of State claims that Ivan Archivaldo, Jesús Alfredo Guzmán Salazar and half-brother Ovidio Guzmán López "have increased their power within the Sinaloa Cartel. They have expanded their enterprise with sophisticated fentanyl laboratories in Culiacán, Mexico, and expanded drug smuggling utilizing maritime and air transportation in addition to smuggling tunnels and border crossings."

The State Department's Rewards for Justice Program offers a $5 million reward for information leading to the arrest and/or conviction of Iván Archivaldo Guzmán Salazar.

References 

Specially Designated Nationals and Blocked Persons List
Fugitives wanted by the United States
Mexican crime bosses
Living people
People from Zapopan, Jalisco
Year of birth missing (living people)